Slaughter City is a play written by Naomi Wallace.  It tells the story of the otherworldly Cod's employment at a slaughterhouse.

Plot
The play was inspired by a number of labor-related incidents including the Triangle Shirtwaist Factory fire of 1911 and the 1993 strike at the Fischer's meat packing plant in Louisville, Kentucky.

The drama follows the lives of a group of workers who work at a modern day plant.  While work gets tougher and more dangerous, their wages are being cut, and benefits reduced.  Into the fray walks Cod, a strange young man who tries to inspire them to action.  But Cod has his own secrets, which include once being a scab, and is in a long term battle with the cool Sausage Man, a battle whose outcome will affect them all in deadly ways.

The play is divided into two acts and moves back and forth (and sometimes seemingly sideways) through time.   Love, desire and friendship between these workers is disrupted, and transformed by the political pressures swirling around them.   And the boss is beginning to make strange noises, just when his assistant has had enough.

The live stage performance rights are licensed by Broadway Play Publishing Inc.

Characters 

Roach- an African American worker, mid-thirties

Maggot- a white worker, mid-thirties

Brandon- a white worker, early twenties

Cod- a white worker of Irish descent, mid-thirties

Tuck- an African American, mid- forties

Textile Worker- a woman, twenties

Sausage Link Man- a white man, energetic, somewhat elderly

Baquin- a white company manager, fifties

References 

Plays by Naomi Wallace
Plays based on actual events